Alfredo Baquerizo Moreno is a canton of the province of Guayas in the Republic of Ecuador. Its official name was given in honor of Alfredo Baquerizo Moreno (1859 – 1951), who served three times as the president of Ecuador. It is also known as Jujan, a name which came from a regional plant. Its canton seat is also known as Alfredo Baquerizo Moreno or Jujan.

As of the census of 2001, there were 19,982 people residing within the canton limits.

Demographics
Ethnic groups as of the Ecuadorian census of 2010:
Mestizo 50.5%
Montubio 38.0%
Afro-Ecuadorian 6.9%
White 4.2%
Indigenous 0.3%
Other 0.1%

Geography 
The Jujan canton is located in the west of the province of Guayas. It is bordered on the north by Los Ríos Province; on the south by Milagro Canton; on the east by the Simón Bolívar Canton; and on the west by the cantons of Samborondón and Yaguachi.

References

External links 
  Alfredo Baquerizo Moreno (Jujan) at Gobierno Provincial del Guayas

Cantons of Guayas Province